The  is a Japanese concert hall located in Ueno Park, Taitō, Tokyo. Designed by Japanese architect Kunio Maekawa, it was built in 1961 and renovated in 1998–99. Its larger hall seats 2303 people, and its small hall seats 649. It is operated by the Tokyo Metropolitan Foundation for History and Culture.

Venues 
Main Hall
Recital Hall

Access
        Ueno Station (with JR East and Tokyo Metro)
  Keisei Ueno Station (with Keisei Electric Railway)

See also

 Suntory Hall
 New National Theatre Tokyo
 Sōgakudo Concert Hall

External links 

Music venues in Tokyo
Concert halls in Japan
Ueno Park
Buildings and structures in Taitō
Music venues completed in 1961
1961 establishments in Japan